Ryan O'Dwyer (born 23 July 1986) is an Irish former inter-county hurler who played as a half forward for Dublin. He continues to play club hurling with Kilmacud Crokes. The County Tipperary-born player previously hurled with his local club Cashel King Cormac's and with the Tipperary senior inter-county team. In 2019 O’Dwyer began coaching Longwood, a small rural club in Meath, with notable players such as Michael Burke. The team will compete in the Meath senior hurling championship of 2019.

Playing career

Club

O'Dwyer played his club hurling and football with the famous King Cormac's club in his home town. He has enjoyed some success but has never won a senior county title. In 2011 he joined Dublin side Kilmacud Crokes.

Inter-county

Tipperary

O'Dwyer first came to prominence on the inter-county scene as a member of the Tipperary minor football team in 2004. He was also a member of the county under-21 hurling team in the mid-2000s. He was a member of the panel in 2005 and went on to capture a Munster medal in that grade in 2006.  The following year O'Dwyer made his senior debut in a National Hurling League game against Kilkenny.  Later that summer he made his senior championship debut, but Tipp had little success. In 2008 the county got off to a winning start with O'Dwyer playing a key role in helping the county capture the National League title. In 2010 he was part of the Tipperary senior football panel.

Dublin

At the end of 2010 he declared for the Dublin senior hurling team for the 2011 season. He helped Dublin to win the Walsh Cup after beating Kilkenny in the final.
He then played on the Dublin side which won the NHL Division 1 title for the first time since the 1930s, also beating Kilkenny in the final, also being named the Man of the Match.
In the 2011 Leinster championship semi-final against Galway, he was shown a straight red card for striking Shane Kavanagh with his hurley, he received a four-week suspension and so missed the Leinster final against Kilkenny. After missing the Leinster Championship final defeat against Kilkenny, Ryan returned for the All-Ireland quarter final against Limerick. Dublin won the quarter final, qualifying for the All-Ireland semi final for the first time since 1948. O'Dwyer scored 3–02 in the game and was awarded the man of the match award.

O'Dwyer announced his retirement from inter-county in July 2018 following Dublin's exit from the championship. He played eight seasons of hurling for his adopted county winning a National Hurling League in 2011 where he received the man of the match award in the final. O'Dwyer was also a key player on the Dublin team that won a Leinster Senior Hurling Championship in 2013 bridging a 52-year gap having not won the competition since 1961.

Inter-provincial

O'Dwyer lined out for Leinster in the Interprovincial Championship. He secured a winners' medal in this competition in 2012 following a 2–19 to 1–15 defeat of Connacht.

Rugby Career

In 2018 as means of keeping fit in the GAA offseason O'Dwyer joined Stillorgan-Rathfarnham RFC. He has played for two seasons, winning the 2019-2020 Leinster Branch Metro Division 4 League during that time. O'Dwyer was the clubs top try scorer during the 2019–2020 season averaging a try a game. However O'Dwyer didn't win the club's player of the year which instead went to Tommy Walsh. O'Dwyer revealed in the outtakes for the TG4 Lochra Gael programme that it is the single disappointment in his sporting career to date.

Honours
Tipperary
 Munster Senior Hurling Championship (1): 2008
 National Hurling League (1): 2008

Dublin
 Walsh Cup (1): 2011
 National Hurling League (1): 2011
 Leinster Senior Hurling Championship (1): 2013

Leinster
 Railway Cup (2): 2012, 2014

References

External links
Tipperary Player Profiles

1986 births
Living people
Tipperary inter-county hurlers
Tipperary inter-county Gaelic footballers
Cashel King Cormac's hurlers
Cashel King Cormac's Gaelic footballers
Dublin inter-county hurlers
Leinster inter-provincial hurlers
Kilmacud Crokes hurlers